Els is a Dutch-language feminine given name, usually a short form of Elisabeth. People with the name include

 Els Aarne (1917–1995), Estonian composer and pedagogue
 Els Beerten (born 1959), Flemish writer of children's literature
 Els Belmans (born 1983), Belgian track cyclist
 Els Bongers (born c.1966), Dutch soprano
 Els Borst (1932–2014), Dutch government minister
 Els van Breda Vriesman (born 1942), Dutch sports executive
 Els Callens (born 1970), Belgian tennis player
 Els Coppens-van de Rijt (born 1943), Dutch artist and author
 Els de Schepper (born 1965), Flemish actress, comedian and writer
 Els De Temmerman (born 1962), Belgian journalist
 Els Decottenier (born 1968), Belgian racing cyclist
 Els Demol (born 1958), Belgian politician
 Els Dietvorst, Belgian artist, filmmaker and shepherd
 Els Dottermans (born 1964), Belgian actress
 Els von Eystett, 15th-century German prostitute
 Els Goulmy (born 1946), Dutch biologist
 Els de Groen (born 1949), Dutch author and politician
 Els van den Horn (1927–1996), Dutch diver
 Els Iping (born 1953), Dutch politician
 Els Mertens (born 1966), Belgian racing cyclist
 Els Moor (1937–2016), Dutch literary historian 
  (born 1976), Flemish poet and writer
 Els van Noorduyn (born 1946), Dutch shot putter (Elsemia)
 Els Pelgrom (born 1934), Dutch writer of children's literature
 Els Pynoo (born 1968), Belgian pop singer
 Els Rens (born 1983), Belgian long-distance runner
 Els Schelfhout (born 1967), Belgian politician
 Els Smekens (born 1986), Belgian dancer
  (1944–2011), Dutch actress, director and playwright
 Els Vader (born 1959), Dutch sprinter
 Els Vandesteene (born 1987), Belgian volleyball player
  (born 1962), Dutch film producer
 Els Vanheusden, Belgian physician
 Els Witte (born 1941), Belgian historian

Dutch feminine given names